Elisabeth Beresford, MBE (6 August 1926 – 24 December 2010), also known as Liza Beresford, was an English author of children's books, best known for creating The Wombles. Born into a literary family, she took work as a journalist, but struggled for success until she created the Wombles in the late 1960s. Their recycling theme was noted especially and the Wombles became popular with children across the world. While Beresford wrote many other works, the Wombles remained her best-known.

Early life and career
Beresford was born on 6 August 1926 in Paris. Her father was J. D. Beresford, a successful novelist who also worked as a book reviewer for several papers. Her godparents included Walter de la Mare, who dedicated poems to her, the poet Cecil Day-Lewis, and the children's writer Eleanor Farjeon. Her parents' friends included H. G. Wells, George Bernard Shaw, John Galsworthy, Hugh Walpole, W. Somerset Maugham and D. H. Lawrence. Beresford attended Brighton and Hove High School.

After 18 months' service as a Wren, Beresford set out as a ghostwriter specialising in writing speeches. She began training as a journalist and was soon writing radio, film and television columns and working as a BBC radio reporter.

Beresford married BBC tennis commentator and broadcaster Max Robertson in 1949. They had one son and one daughter. Trips to Australia, South Africa and the West Indies with Robertson led her to write children's books. The Television Mystery (1957), her first, was among several "conventional adventure stories and thrillers", and two television series: Seven Days to Sydney and Come to the Caribbean. Awkward Magic (1964) was the first of several fantasies after the manner of E. Nesbit.

Beresford struggled as a children's author and freelance journalist in the 1960s. This changed with her creation of the Wombles.

The Wombles

The name "Wombles" was inspired by her daughter Kate's mispronunciation ("Ma, isn't it great on Wombledon Common?") when Beresford took her children to Wimbledon Common for a Boxing Day stroll. That same day, Beresford made a list of Womble names. Many characters were based on her family: Great Uncle Bulgaria on her father-in-law, Tobermory on her brother, a skilled inventor, Orinoco on her son, and Madame Cholet on her mother. The Wombles' names came from sources as varied as the town where Beresford's daughter went on a French exchange and the name of the college attended by a nephew.

The first Wombles book appeared in 1968, illustrated by Margaret Gordon, whose work on all the early Wombles books defined their distinctive appearance. After a broadcast on Jackanory, the BBC decided to make an animated series.

The Wombles' motto, "Make Good Use of Bad Rubbish," and their passion for recycling was far ahead of its time, and inspired children to begin organising "Womble Clearing Up Groups". Thirty-five five-minute films were broadcast on BBC 1, accompanied by Mike Batt's music and the Wombles' theme song, "Wombling Free". Marked by actor Bernard Cribbins's voices and the work of animators Ivor Wood and (later) Barry Leith, the Wombles grew in popularity. Beresford took part in live phone-ins with children in Australia. In South Africa she enchanted a hundred Zulus with Womble stories. Back in England, she made countless public appearances with the Wombles across the country.

Within ten years, Beresford had written over 20 Wombles books (translated into more than 40 languages), another 30 television films, and a Wombles stage show, one version of which ran in the West End. The range of Wombles products that appeared included soap, T-shirts, mugs, washing-up cloths and soft toys.

Later life
Beresford and her family moved to Alderney in the Channel Islands in the mid-1970s. She and her husband Max Robertson divorced in 1984.

Apart from her Wombles books, Beresford wrote various adventure and mystery books for children, many based on the island of Alderney, where she lived in a 300-year-old cottage in St Anne. She collaborated with Jane Aireton on a children's television series for Channel Television, Bertie the Bat in 1990 and The Adventures of Dawdle the Donkey for ITV Anglia between 1996 and 1999. Beresford was made a Member of the Order of the British Empire for her services to children's literature in the 1998 New Year Honours.

Beresford died at 10:30 pm on 24 December 2010 in Alderney's Mignot Memorial Hospital. Her son Marcus Robertson reported the cause of her death as heart failure.

American actors Griffin Newman and James Newman are her great-nephews.

References

External links
Elisabeth Beresford: A Lady who changed My Life is an obituary by Mike Batt.
Obituary for Elisabeth Beresford, and Mike Batt's connections with the Wombles (same text, probably, but on Batt's own website)
Fantastic Fiction: Elisabeth Beresford contains a list of Beresford's literary works.
The Wombles is the official Wombles website.
Tidy Bag: The online Wombles museum is dedicated to Beresford's most well-known creation.

1926 births
2010 deaths
English children's writers
Members of the Order of the British Empire
The Wombles
People educated at Brighton and Hove High School
Women's Royal Naval Service ratings
Writers from Paris
French emigrants to England
Women's Royal Naval Service personnel of World War II